Erick Friedman (16 August 1939 – 30 March 2004) was an American violinist.
He performed around the world as guest soloist with orchestras such as the New York Philharmonic, the Berlin Philharmonic, Orchestre de Paris, Chicago Symphony Orchestra, and the Boston Symphony Orchestra. He collaborated with conductors such as Karajan, Stokowski, Steinberg, Leinsdorf, Previn, and Ozawa. He won a Grammy Award in 1996.

Early life 
Friedman started playing the violin at age 6. He attended Juilliard at age 10, and was the only violinist to be a private student of both Nathan Milstein and Jascha Heifetz. He began studies with Heifetz at age 17 at the University of Southern California and recorded the Bach Double Concerto with him in 1961.

Career 
Friedman worked as a concert artist and teacher, appearing with dozens of symphony orchestras throughout the world, and holding the positions of artist-in-residence at Southern Methodist and the Mischa Elman chair at the Manhattan School of Music.

In the early 1970s, Mr. Friedman was on the violin faculty of the North Carolina School of the Arts.

An automobile accident in the late 1980s injured his left hand. His first solo performance following his recovery was in Garrett County, MD for the Symphony at Deep Creek.

Friedman took a professorship at Yale University, where he stayed for the remainder of his life, holding several master classes. During this time, he judged at many competitions, was a conductor, and from 1986 to 1999, he was the music director and conductor for the Symphony at Deep Creek, a summer arts program with the Garrett Lakes Arts Festival. He has also taught at the Manhattan School of Music and Southern Methodist University.

Violins 

Most notably, Erick Friedman performed and recorded on an Antonio Stradivarius made in 1724, in Cremona, Italy, known as the 'Ludwig'.  He also performed on two instruments in the 1970's made by Giuseppe Guarneri 'del Gesù' in Cremona, Italy; the 'Lafont-Siskovsky' made in 1733, and the 'Balokovic' circa 1725-1729.

Awards 

 Grammy in 1996 (38th Annual) for his participation in the release of a set of all of Heifetz's recordings for RCA Victor
 2000 Ignace J. Paderewski Award for Distinguished Contributions to Society and Culture

Death 
Mr. Friedman died of lung cancer on Tuesday, March 30, 2004. He was teaching at Yale until the week before he died. He was survived by his son, Brian, two grandchildren, Noah and Rachel, and his wife, Lu Sun Friedman, also a professional violinist.

References

 Erick Friedman Tribute Website 
 https://web.archive.org/web/20090706105248/http://www.blogofdeath.com/archives/000858.html 
 Erick Friedman Tribute on Facebook
, WNCN-FM, 1-Oct-1982
, WNCN-FM, 16-Sep-1983
, ~1983

American male violinists
1939 births
2004 deaths
20th-century American violinists
20th-century American male musicians